The 1958 European Women's Basketball Championship was the 6th regional championship held by FIBA Europe for women. The competition was held in Łódź, Poland and took place May 9–18, 1958. Bulgaria won their first gold medal, while the Soviet Union, champions of the previous edition received the silver. Czechoslovakia won the bronze medal.

Preliminary round
The teams where divided into three groups. The first two from each group would go to the Final Round. The remaining teams went to the Classification Round to determine the 7th–10th spots.

Group A

Group B

Group C

Classification round

Final round

Final standings

References 
 EuroBasket 1958; fibaeurope.com
 Women Basketball European Championship 1958; todor66.com

External links
 FIBA Archive

1958
1958 in women's basketball
1958 in Polish women's sport
International basketball competitions hosted by Poland
May 1958 sports events in Europe
Women's basketball in Poland
EuroBasket Women